Vahid Dalirzahan (born March 28, 1995) is an Iranian basketball player for Army and the Iranian national team.

He participated at the 2017 FIBA Asia Cup.

References

1995 births
Living people
Iranian men's basketball players
Sportspeople from Mashhad
Small forwards
Mahram Tehran BC players
Basketball players at the 2018 Asian Games
Asian Games silver medalists for Iran
Medalists at the 2018 Asian Games
Asian Games medalists in basketball